The following is the list of notable religious personalities who followed the Hanafi Islamic madhab followed by the section of Contemporary living Hanafi scholars, in chronological order:

Abu Hanifa (d. 767)
Ibn al-Mubarak (d. 797)
Abu Yusuf (d. 798)
Muhammad al-Shaybani (d. 805)
Abd al-Razzaq al-San'ani (d. 827)
Yahya ibn Ma'in (d. 847)
Al-Hassaf (d. 874)
Al-Tahawi (d. 933)
Abu Mansur al-Maturidi (d. 944)
Abu al-Layth al-Samarqandi (d. 983)
Abul Ikhlas Hasan ibn `Ammar ibn `Ali al Shurunbulali al Wafa'i (d. 1069)
Al-Sarakhsi (d. 1090)
Abu al-Yusr al-Bazdawi (d. 1100)
Yusuf Hamadani (d. 1141)
Abu Hafs Umar al-Nasafi (d. 1142)
Al-Kasani (d. 1191)
Burhan al-Din al-Marghinani (d. 1197)
Abu Tawwama (d. 1300)
Uthman Siraj ad-Din (d. 1357)
Ala al-Haq (1301-1384)
Ibn Abi al-Izz (1331-1390)
Nur Qutb Alam (d. 1416)
Badr al-Din al-Ayni (d. 1451)
Ibn Kemal (d. 1536)
Ibrahim al-Halabi (d. 1549)
Usman Bengali (d. 1573)
Ali al-Qari (d. 1605)
Ahmad Sirhindi (d. 1624)
'Abd al-Haqq al-Dehlawi (d. 1642)
Mir Zahid Harawi (d. 1689)
Khayr al-Din al-Ramli (d. 1671)
Muhammad Salih Bengali (1700s)
Abd al-Ghani al-Nabulsi (d. 1731)
Shah Waliullah Dehlawi (d. 1762)
Shah Nuri Bengali (d. 1785)
Fakhr ad-Din al-Burdwani (d. 1785)
Mawlana Murad (1790s)
Majduddin (d. 1813)
Shah Abdul Aziz Dehlavi (d. 1824)
Ibn Abidin (d. 1836)
Haji Shariatullah (1781-1840)
Mamluk Ali Nanautawi (1789 — 7 October 1851)
Muhsinuddin Ahmad (1819–1862)
Karamat Ali Jaunpuri (1800-1873)
Najib Ali Choudhury (1870s)
Naqi Ali Khan (1830 — 1880)
Muhammad Qasim Nanautavi (1832 — 15 April 1880)
Al-Maydani (d. 1881)
Yaqub Nanautawi (1833 — 1884)
Abd al-Hayy al-Lucknawi (d. 1886)
Mahmud Deobandi (d. 1886)
Hafiz Ahmad Jaunpuri (1834-1899)
Abdul Wahid Bengali (1850-1905)
Rashid Ahmad Gangohi (1826 — 1905)
Abdul Hamid Madarshahi (1869 - 31 March 1920)
Mahmud Hasan Deobandi (1851 — 30 November 1920)
Abdul Awwal Jaunpuri (1867 – 18 June 1921)
Ahmed Raza Khan Barelvi (14 June 1856 — 28 October 1921)
Sufi Azizur Rahman (1862-1922)
Aziz-ul-Rahman Usmani (d. 1928)
Hafiz Muhammad Ahmad (1862 — 1930)
Ibrahim Ali Tashna (1872-1931)
Anwar Shah Kashmiri (16 November 1875 — 28 May 1933)
Majid Ali Jaunpuri (d. 1935)
Abdur Rab Jaunpuri (1875 – June 1935)
Mohammad Abu Bakr Siddique Pir-e-Furfura (15 April 1865- 17 March 1943)
Shukrullah Mubarakpuri (1895/1896 — 23 March 1942)
Ibrahim Ujani (1863-1943)
Habibullah Qurayshi (1865-1943)
Ashraf Ali Thanwi (19 August 1863 — 4 July 1943)
Ubaidullah Sindhi (10 March 1872 — 21 August 1944)
Hamid Raza Khan (1875 — 1943)
Asghar Hussain Deobandi (16 October 1877 — 8 January 1945)
Muhammad Mian Mansoor Ansari (1884 — 11 January 1946)
Muhammad Sahool Bhagalpuri (d. 1948)
Shabbir Ahmad Usmani (11 October 1887 — 13 December 1949)
Murtaza Hasan Chandpuri (1868 — 1951)
Nesaruddin Ahmad (1873 — 1952)
Muhammad Zahid al-Kawthari (1879 — 1952)
Kifayatullah Dehlawi (1875 — 31 December 1952)
Izaz Ali Amrohi (November 1882 — 1955)
Manazir Ahsan Gilani (1 October 1892 — 5 June 1956)
Hussain Ahmed Madani (6 October 1879 — 5 December 1957)
Ahmed Ali Enayetpuri (1898-1959)
Azizul Haq (1903-1961)
Shah Ahmad Hasan (1882-1967)
Syed Fakhruddin Ahmad (1889 — 1972)
Mustafa Raza Khan Qadri (1892 — 1981)
Maqsudullah (1883-1961)
Ibrahim Raza Khan (1907 — 1965)
Shamsul Haque Faridpuri (1896-1969)
Mushahid Ahmad Bayampuri (1907-1971)
Abdur Rahman Kashgari (d. 1971)
Deen Muhammad Khan (1900-1974)
Amimul Ehsan Barkati (1911-1974)
Muhammad Miyan Deobandi (1903 — 1975)
Muhammad Faizullah (1890-1976)
Abdul Wahhab Pirji (1890 - 29 September 1976)
Athar Ali Bengali (1891- 6 October 1976)
Abdul Hamid Khan Bhashani (12 December 1880 - 17 November 1976)
Muhammad Shafi Deobandi (25 January 1897 — 6 October 1976)
Syed Muhammad Ishaq (1915 — 1977)
Mufti Mahmud (1919 — 1980)
Muhammad Zakariyya al-Kandhlawi (2 February 1898 — 24 May 1982)
Shah Abd al-Wahhab (1894 — 2 June 1982)
Ibrahim Chatuli (1894-1984)
Faiz-ul Hassan Shah (1911- 23 February 1984)
Saeed Ahmad Akbarabadi (1908 — 1985)
Harun Babunagari (1902-1986)
Abdur Rashid Tarkabagish (1900-1986)
Abdur Rahim Firozpuri (1918-1987)
Muhammadullah Hafezzi (1895-1987)
Shamsul Huda Panchbagi (1897-1988)
Uzair Gul Peshawari (d. 17 November 1989)
Abdul Jalil Choudhury (1925-1989)
Abu Zafar Mohammad Saleh (1915-1990)
Abdul Matin Chowdhury (1915-1990)
Muhammad Taqi Amini (5 May 1926 — 21 January 1991)
Abul Hasan Jashori (1918 – 8 July 1993)
Muhammad Ayyub Ali (1919-1995)
Abdul Haque Faridi (25 May 1903 – 5 February 1996)
Mahmood Hasan Gangohi (1907 — 2 September 1996)
Shamsuddin Qasemi (5 March 1935 — 19 October 1996)
ʿAbd al-Fattah Abu Ghuddah (9 May 1917 – 16 February 1997)
Shah Sultan Ahmad Nanupuri (26 June 1914 – 16 August 1997)
Abul Hasan Ali Hasani Nadwi (5 December 1913 — 31 December 1999)
Aashiq Ilahi Bulandshahri (1925 — 2002)
Nur Uddin Gohorpuri (1924-2005)
Ashraf Ali Bishwanathi (1928-2005)
Abrarul Haq Haqqi (20 December 1920 — 17 May 2006)
Syed Fazlul Karim (1935 – 26 November 2006)
Ubaidul Haq (1928-2007)
Obaidul Haque Wazirpuri (1934-2008)
Abdul Latif Chowdhury Fultali (1913-2008)
Anzar Shah Kashmiri (1927 — 2008)
Naseeruddin Naseer Gilani (1949 — 2009)
Abu Saeed Muhammad Omar Ali (1 October 1945 – 14 August 2010)
Zafeeruddin Miftahi (7 March 1926 — 31 March 2011)
Azizul Haque (1919 — 2012)
Abdus Sattar Akon (1929-2012)
Fazlul Haque Amini (1945 — 12 December 2012)
Qazi Mu'tasim Billah (15 June 1933 – 15 July 2013)
Nurul Islam Farooqi (1959-2014)
Abdur Rahman Chatgami (1920-2015)
Muhiuddin Khan (1935-2016)
Abdul Jabbar Jahanabadi (1937-2016)
Abdul Haq Azmi (1928 — 30 December 2016)
Yunus Jaunpuri (1937-2017)
Muhammad Salim Qasmi (8 January 1926 — 14 April 2018)
Akhtar Raza Khan (1943 — 2018)
Tafazzul Haque Habiganji (1938-2020)
Saeed Ahmad Palanpuri (1940 — 19 May 2020)
Salman Mazahiri (10 October 1946 — 20 July 2020)
Muhammad Adil Khan (d. 10 October 2020)
Muhammad Abdus Sobhan (1936-2020)
Shah Ahmad Shafi (1945-2020)
Nur Hossain Kasemi (1945-2020)
Nizamuddin Asir Adrawi (1926 — 2021)
Noor Alam Khalil Amini (18 December 1952 — 3 May 2021)
Muhammad Wakkas (1952-2021)
Junaid Babunagari (1953-2021)
Abdus Salam Chatgami (1943-2021)
Nurul Islam Jihadi (1916-2021)
Abdul Halim Bukhari (1945–2022)
Muhammad Sadik Muhammad Yusuf (15 April 1952 — 10 March 2015)
Karwan-I-Islami

Contemporary Hanafi scholars
 DR Mohammed Tahirul qadri
 Muhibbullah Babunagari (born 1935)
 Raza Saqib
 Khadim Hussain Rizvi
 Mahmudul Hasan (born: 5 July 1950)
 Syed Rezaul Karim (born 1 February 1971)
 Mufti Muhammad Rafi Usmani (born: 21 July 1936 )
 Mushtaque Ahmad (born 1967)
 Mufti Abul Qasim Nomani (born: 14 January 1947).
 Salman Husaini Nadwi (born: 1954)
 Muhammad Sufyan Qasmi (born: 26 September 1954).
 Rawil Gaynetdin (born: 25 August 1959).
 Husein Kavazović (born: 3 July 1964).
 Muhammad Saad Kandhlawi (born: 10 May 1965).
 Mahfuzul Haque (born: 1969)
 Abu Yusuf Riyadh ul Haq (born: 1971).
 Abdur Rahman ibn Yusuf Mangera (born: 1974).
 Mufti Ebrahim Desai
 Mamunul Haque (born: 1973)
 Fuzail Ahmad Nasiri (born: 13 May 1978)
 Yusuf Ziya Kavakçı
 Muhammad ibn Adam Al-Kawthari
 Zulfiqar Ahmad Naqshbandi (born 1 April 1953)

See also 
 Ahl al-Ra'y

References

Sunni Islam
Lists of Muslims

Maturidis